The 2007–08 Superliga Espanola de Hockey Hielo season was the 34th season of the Superliga Espanola de Hockey Hielo, the top level of ice hockey in Spain. Six teams participated in the league, and CG Puigcerda won the championship.

Standings

Playoffs

Pre-Playoffs 
 CH Gasteiz – CH Txuri Urdin 2:0 (6:3, 3:2 OT)
 Majadahonda HC – FC Barcelona 0:2 (1:9, 1:11)

Semifinals 
 Anglet Hormadi Élite – FC Barcelona 2:0 (5:2, 5:3)
 CH Gasteiz – CG Puigcerdà 0:2 (4:7, 4:13)

Final 
 Anglet Hormadi Élite – CG Puigcerdà 0:2 (6:7, 6:8)

External links
Season on hockeyarchives.info

Liga Nacional de Hockey Hielo seasons
Spa
Liga